XHCJH-TDT, virtual channel 20 (UHF digital channel 36), is a television station located in  Ciudad Juárez, Chihuahua, Mexico. The station is owned by TV Azteca and carries its Azteca 7 network.

Technical information

Subchannels 
The station's digital signal is multiplexed:

XHCJH-TDT remained on virtual channel 20 after October 2016 because the use of channel 7 would conflict with KVIA-TV.

Analog-to-digital conversion 
Due to the Mexican analog-to-digital conversion mandate, XHCJH-TV analog channel 20 was shut down on July 14, 2015.

References 

Azteca 7 transmitters
Spanish-language television stations in Mexico
HCJH-TDT
Television channels and stations established in 1997